Why Not... is the final album by organist Don Patterson recorded in 1978 and released on the Muse label.

Reception
Allmusic awarded the album 3 stars.

Track listing 
All compositions by Don Patterson
 "Why Not" - 11:35   
 "Aries" - 8:08   
 "Dem New York Dues" - 8:05   
 "Three Miles Out" - 5:30   
 "Freddie Tooks, Jr." - 6:30

Personnel 
Don Patterson - organ
Virgil Jones - trumpet
Bootsie Barnes - tenor saxophone
Eddie McFadden - guitar
Idris Muhammad - drums

References 

Don Patterson (organist) albums
1978 albums
Muse Records albums
Albums recorded at Van Gelder Studio